Barbie and the Rockers: Out of This World is a 1987 American animated television special created by DIC Animation City with Saban Productions featuring popular Mattel character Barbie. The story was based on the Barbie and the Rockers line of dolls, which featured Barbie as the leader of a rock band. The special originally aired in syndication as a two-part television "miniseries" with each installment lasting approximately 25 minutes; part two was titled Barbie & Sensations: Rockin' Back to Earth. It was later released as a single film by Hi-Tops Video.

The miniseries was supposed to have been the pilot for a daily Barbie cartoon series. However, negotiations between DIC and Mattel fell through, and the project eventually emerged with a whole new set of characters—and the sponsorship of Mattel rival Hasbro—as Maxie's World in 1988.

Plot
Barbie's rock band completes a successful world tour and decides to perform one last concert in space to promote world peace.

Songs
This is a list of the songs featured in Barbie & Rockers: Out of This World, in order of appearance:

Catch Us If You Can - The Dave Clark Five
 "Disco Dolly" – Sharon Lewis, Mary Adams, Joanne Wilson and Sarah Jayson
 (Shake Shake Shake) Shake Your Booty - KC & The Sunshine Band
 "Stayin Alive" – Bee Gees
 "I'm Happy Just to Dance with You" (The Beatles cover) – Sharon Lewis
 "Do You Believe in Magic" (The Lovin' Spoonful cover) – Sharon Lewis
 "The Name Game" – Sharon Lewis
 ''Blockbuster Video Kids Commercial Song - Sharon Lewls
 "Disco Dolly" – Sharon Lewis

Cast
 Sharon Lewis as Barbie
 Michael Breyner as Ken
 Mary Adams as Dana Yeosan
 Sarah Jayson as Ophelia "Diva" Butler
 Joanne Wilson as Dee Dee Schwitzerson

Additional voices
 Garry Chalk
 Doc Harris
 Lynn Johnson
 Viktoria Langton
 Debbie Lick
 Cathy Mead
 Doug Parker
 John Payne
 Nikki Sharp
 Veena Sood
 John Stocker

References

External links
 
 

1980s American animated films
1980s American television specials
1980s musical films
1980s science fiction adventure films
1980s animated television specials
1987 television specials
American children's animated space adventure films
American children's animated musical films
American children's animated science fiction films
American rock music films
Rockers: Out Of This World
DIC Entertainment films
English-language television shows
Films about musical groups
Animated films about time travel
Films set in 1959
Films set in 1987
Films set in the United States
Musical television specials
Saban Entertainment films
Science fiction musical films
Science fiction television specials
1987 films
Films scored by Shuki Levy
Films scored by Haim Saban
Television pilots not picked up as a series
Films directed by Bernard Deyriès
1980s French films